Nigel Walker (born 15 June 1963) is a former Welsh track and field athlete and Wales international rugby union player.  He is currently Welsh Rugby Union's acting CEO, after the resignation of Steve Phillips. He was born in Cardiff.

Walker represented Great Britain and Northern Ireland at the 1984 Summer Olympics in the 110 metres hurdles.  In 1992 however, he failed to make the squad for the 1992 Summer Olympics and turned to rugby union. Walker holds the fastest non-winning time for the 200-metre hurdles. At Cardiff in 1991, he ran 22.77 seconds into a 0.3 m/

As a rugby player, he played on the wing for Cardiff RFC. Walker made his Wales debut on 6 March 1993 in the five nations match against Ireland.  He went on to win 17 caps for Wales, scoring 12 tries and making his final appearance 21 February 1998 against England.

Walker was a participant in Catchphrase, a Welsh learning programme broadcast on Radio Wales in 2000. Walker was appointed Head of Sport at BBC Wales in 2001. In 2010, Walker became the National Director at the English Institute of Sport (EIS). In 2018, celebrating Black History Month in the United Kingdom, Walker was included in a list of 100 "Brilliant, Black and Welsh" people.

Walker left his role at the EIS in Autumn 2021, to take up the position of Performance Director at the Welsh Rugby Union. He became the acting CEO of the WRU in January 2023 following the resignation of Steve Phillips.

Contrary to a frequent rumour, he did not participate in Gladiators. Walker dispelled the rumour: "I didn’t compete in Gladiators. It’s a big myth. Glen Webbe did, I didn’t. I have corrected it on Wikipedia three times and it keeps coming back up".

International competitions

References 

 Planet-rugby stats
 sporting heroes

1963 births
Living people
Rugby union players from Cardiff
Wales international rugby union players
Welsh male hurdlers
Olympic athletes of Great Britain
Athletes (track and field) at the 1984 Summer Olympics
Commonwealth Games competitors for Wales
Athletes (track and field) at the 1986 Commonwealth Games
Athletes (track and field) at the 1990 Commonwealth Games
World Athletics Championships athletes for Great Britain
Cardiff RFC players
Black British sportsmen
World Athletics Indoor Championships medalists
Rugby union wings